The water kingfishers or Cerylinae are one of the three subfamilies of kingfishers, and are also known as the cerylid kingfishers. All six American species are in this subfamily.

These are all specialist fish-eating species, unlike many representatives of the other two subfamilies, and it is likely that they are all descended from fish-eating kingfishers which founded populations in the New World. It was believed that the entire group evolved in the Americas, but this seems not to be true. The original ancestor possibly evolved in Africa – at any rate in the Old World – and the Chloroceryle species are the youngest ones.

Phylogeny
Evidence from molecular phylogenetic studies suggests that the Cerylinae originated in Asia and have colonised the New World on two occasions: the first time was around 8 million years ago by the Chloroceryle and the second time was around 1.9 million years ago by the common ancestor of the ringed kingfisher and the belted kingfisher in the genus Megaceryle.

The subfamily Cerylinae contains nine kingfisher species and is divided into three genera:

References

 Fry, K & Fry, H. C. (1999): Kingfishers, Bee-eaters and Rollers, new edition. Christopher Helm Publishers. 
 Moyle, Robert G. (2006): A Molecular Phylogeny of Kingfishers (Alcedinidae) With Insights into Early Biogeographic History. Auk 123(2): 487–499. HTML fulltext (without images)

External links
Water kingfisher videos on the Internet Bird Collection

Kingfishers
Taxa named by Ludwig Reichenbach